Carmen Arrufat Blasco (born 11 October 2002) is a Spanish film and television actress. Her performance in The Innocence earned her a nomination to the Goya Award for Best New Actress. She became known to a television audience for her villainess role in the television series HIT.

Biography 
Born on 11 October 2002 in Castellón de la Plana, Arrufat took acting courses since she was 11 year old, and she trained at Aula Cine y TV, a drama school operated by Víctor Antolí.

Arrufat debuted as a leading actress in a feature film in the 2019 drama The Innocence (she lied about her age being 16 while she was still 15 in order to get the role). Her performance earned her a nomination to the Goya Award for Best New Actress. She moved to Madrid and she was cast for the role of the manipulative and narcissist Lena Vallejo in the television series HIT. Shooting of the series started in January 2020, but it was interrupted by the COVID-19 lockdown, so Arrufat rather performed a teenager trapped with her family during the COVID-19 lockdown in the comedy series Diarios de la cuarentena, aired from April to May 2020 on La 1. The filming of HIT resumed in June 2020 after a hiatus and it wrapped in July. Later in 2020, Arrufat was cast in the Movistar+ thriller series Todos mienten. She also joined the main cast of Elite's season 6.

Filmography

Film

Television

Accolades

References 

2002 births
People from Castellón de la Plana
21st-century Spanish actresses
Spanish film actresses
Spanish television actresses
Living people
Actresses from the Valencian Community